Comadia dolli is a moth in the family Cossidae first described by William Barnes and Foster Hendrickson Benjamin in 1923. It is found in North America, where it has been recorded from Arizona, California, Nevada and New Mexico.

The wingspan is 12–15 mm. The forewings are creamish white. The costa is checkered, while the rest of the wing is scattered with brown scales. The hindwings are the same color or slightly darker. Adults have been recorded on wing from May to August.

References

Cossinae
Moths described in 1923
Moths of North America